The Domenareh Mosque is located in Saqqez, Iran. It is one of the oldest mosques in Saqqez as well as the whole of Kurdistan Province surviving in its full original form. It belongs to the Afshari time and the early Zandian period. This work was registered as one of the national works of Iran on March 16, 1999 with the registration number 2600.

Construction
This mosque has an almost square plan. In its construction, materials such as raw clay, mud mortar, carcasses, bricks and wood have been used. The entrance of this mosque is located on the west side. At the entrance, it has a brick door with a Chinese knot texture of yellow bricks and tiles; Which represents the Zandieh period. After the entrance, there is a corridor of about 3 by 3.5 meters, from which the roof of the mosque can be reached by nine steps.

History
According to local traditions, the mosque dates back to the time of Sheikh Hassan Molanabad, a famous mystic and mathematician of the Afshari era. When Nader Shah Afshar left for Baghdad, he passed through Saqqez and at the request of Sheikh Hassan Molanabad to build a mosque for the people of that city, Nader Shah ordered the construction of this mosque in the old part of Saqqez. Even now, some locals call this mosque Sheikh Hassan Molanabad Mosque.
One of the signs and reasons for the validity of this claim is that in this journey, Nader Shah also gives two inlays and a beautiful painted leather tablecloth as a gift to Sheikh Hassan. These gifts are currently kept in the village of Molanabad, where Sheikh Hassan's tomb is located. There is also a Manuscript Quran in the tomb of Sheikh Hassan, which dates back to the late Afshari period.

Gallery

References

17th-century mosques
Mosques in Iran
Architecture in Iran
Mosque buildings with domes
Religious buildings and structures
Saqqez County
Tourist attractions in Saqqez
Buildings and structures in Kurdistan
Tourist attractions in Kurdistan